Caineach inion Urchadh Princess of  the Uí Briúin Seóla and Queen of Connacht, fl. early 10th century.

Caineach was one of three daughters of King Urchadh mac Murchadh of Maigh Seóla (died 943). She became the wife of a prince of the Síol Muiredaig.

She was an aunt of three notable Irish rulers:

 King Máel Ruanaid Mór mac Tadg of Moylurg (fl. 956))
 King Conchobar mac Tadg of Connacht (reigned 967-973)
 High King of Ireland, Brian Boru (reigned 1002–1014)

See also

 Cainnech (Irish name)

External links
 Annals of Ulster at CELT: Corpus of Electronic Texts at University College Cork

References

 West or H-Iar Connaught Ruaidhrí Ó Flaithbheartaigh, 1684 (published 1846, ed. James Hardiman).
 Origin of the Surname O'Flaherty, Anthony Matthews, Dublin, 1968, p. 40.
 Early Irish Kingship and Succession, Bart Jaski, Four Courts Press, 2000.
 Irish Kings and High-Kings, Francis John Byrne (2001), Dublin: Four Courts Press, 
 The Great Book of Irish Genealogies, Dubhaltach MacFhirbhisigh: Edited by Nollaig Ó Muraíle, five volumes, Dublin, DeBurca Books, 2003-2004. .

People from County Galway
10th-century Irish people
Irish princesses
10th-century Irish women